KFMS-LD (channel 47) is a low-power television station licensed to and serving Sacramento, California, United States, as an affiliate of beIN Sports Xtra en Español. The station is owned by HC2 Holdings. KFMS-LD's transmitter is located on North Market Boulevard near Sacramento.

History 
The station's construction permit was initially issued on February 25, 2010 under the calls of K47ML-D and changed to KFMS-LD on March 12, 2010.

In 2021, the station's original city of license in Keyes, California was moved to Sacramento.

Technical information

Subchannels
The station's digital channel is multiplexed:

References

External links
DTV America

Low-power television stations in the United States
Innovate Corp.
FMS-LD
Television channels and stations established in 2010
2010 establishments in California